The Whitworth Society was founded in 1923 by Henry Selby Hele-Shaw, then president of the Institution of Mechanical Engineers. Its purposes are to promote engineering in the United Kingdom, and more specifically to support all Whitworth Scholars, the recipients of a scholarship funded by Joseph Whitworth's scholarship scheme, which started in 1868.  A Whitworth Scholar is the result of completing a successful Whitworth Scholarship. Membership of the Society is limited to Whitworth Scholars, Senior Scholars, Fellows, Exhibitioners and Prizemen. The Society is a way for making contact with all successful "Whitworth's" and provides a way for making information contacts and connections from more senior members to recently successful Scholars. The Society also serves as a way to commemorate Joseph Whitworth and acknowledge his contributions to engineering education.

Activities

Commemorative dinner and annual general meeting 
The annual dinner and annual general meeting is held on the evening of 18 March (or nearest Friday to) to commemorate the date in 1868 when Joseph Whitworth wrote to Benjamin Disraeli, offering to found the Whitworth Scholarships.  Traditionally the dinner has been held in London until more recent times where the meal and meeting is alternated, one-year London and one-year Manchester.

Summer meeting 
There is a summer meeting held over two-days normally at the beginning of July.  The event is largely informal and ordinarily arranged by the President of the Society.

Record 
A record of all scholars is kept by the Society, until recent years, this was in hardback form (see image) presented when an individual was elected a scholar.  In recent times, the register is kept electronically and provided by USB flash drive as part of the awards ceremony.

Whitworth Scholarship 
A Whitworth Scholarship, named after Joseph Whitworth, is an "award for outstanding engineers, who have excellent academic and practical skills and the qualities needed to succeed in industry, to take an engineering degree-level programme in any engineering discipline".

Background 
On 18 March 1868, Joseph Whitworth wrote to then Prime Minister Benjamin Disraeli to fund 30 scholarships for the value of £100 for young men in the United Kingdom. This was met favourably by the Government at the time as minuted on 27 March 1868 by the council.  After the adoption of this by Government, Whitworth presented a memorandum setting out the requirements of the awards which included examinations in mathematics, mechanics, physics, and chemistry, including metallurgy and in the following handicrafts: Smith's Work, turning, filing, fitting, pattern making and moulding.

Whitworth's intent was to support those individuals with practical skills, training, typically those who today have completed an apprenticeship who had the desire to continue onto further, higher education, university degree courses. The Scholarships continue over 150-years after inception of the idea.  In 2018 the prize money awarded is up to £5,450 per annum for an undergraduate programme and £8,250 per annum for a post graduate research programme.  The prize money is still funded by the original money provided in Trust by Joseph Whitworth.

The criteria for a scholarship remains consistent with the original mandate of 1868, practical skills with aptitude for science and mathematic based academia.  In 2018, the conditions for application for a scholarship are to:

 Have pursued a vocational training route (i.e. apprenticeship) in an engineering discipline typically for at least 2 years after having left full-time education (generally UK secondary education or college based study) and before entering a degree-level engineering course.
 Have obtained or will obtain an appropriate qualification for admission to the planned engineering degree-level programme of any engineering discipline.   
 Be British, Commonwealth or European Union citizen, and resident in the UK for at least 3 consecutive years immediately prior to undertaking study in the UK at a College of FE/HE or university

In 1984, as a result of consultation with the Whitworth Society, the administration of the Awards and Scholarship programmes was transferred from the Department of Education & Science (at the time) to the Institution of Mechanical Engineers.

Current scholarship 

Today, the scholarship programme lasts for the duration of an individual's academic studies, typically 3–4 years of full-time degree studies.  During this time, the individuals are termed "award holders".

If the continued monitoring of progress and overall academic achievement is deemed satisfactory, the award holder becomes a Whitworth Scholar.  This occasion is commemorated at the Institution of Mechanical Engineers Vision Awards ceremony ordinarily carried out in the September/October period of each year.

Whitworth Scholar 
A Whitworth Scholar is the accolade given to those who have successfully completed a Whitworth Scholarship.  It is rare on the basis that only a small number of scholarships are issued each year which has quite specific application conditions and a tough review process.

A Whitworth Scholar is permitted to use the post-nominal letters, Wh.Sch.

Typically there is an awards ceremony for the successful scholars where a certificate and medal (shown opposite) are presented.  In recent years forms part of the IMechE's vision awards in September/October time each year.

Post nominals 
There are recognised post-nominals which are permitted to be used after an individual's name.  They are as follows.

Officers

See also

 List of mechanical engineering awards

References

Engineering education in the United Kingdom
Mechanical engineering awards
Mechanical engineering organizations
1923 establishments in the United Kingdom
Scientific organisations based in the United Kingdom
Scientific organizations established in 1923